Shri C. Ramachandra Rao (born in 1931 in Peddapuram), a Municipal town in the East Godavari District of Andhra Pradesh, India is a Telugu Short Story writer, tennis player and South Indian Plantationer.

He was ranked No.1 tennis player in the State of Andhra Pradesh for a number of years up to 1956.

Ramachandra Rao is a post-graduate in Political Science from Presidency College, Chennai (1950 batch), and also holds a bachelor's degree in Law from Madras University.

C. Ramachandra Rao wrote short stories during the 1960s which are published as a collection of short stories under the title Velu Pillai  This book had won him wide acclaim. His famous short stories include "Velu Pillai", "Nalla Tholu", "Enugula Rayi", "Gali Devaru", "Tennis Tournament" etc.

Rao's stories are acclaimed for their realistic and lifelike depiction of plantation life. In a span of fifty years he wrote only nine short stories, but each of these are critically acclaimed by many eminent Telugu writers like Chaso, Bapu, Mullapudi Venkata Ramana, Nanduri Rammohana Rao and many others.

Short stories
 Velu Pillai
 Nalla Tholu
 Gali Devaru
 Enugula Rayi
 Fancy Dress Party
 Tennis Tournament
 Udyogam
 Club Night
 Company Lease
 Sami Kumbudu

References

Living people
1931 births
Telugu writers
Presidency College, Chennai alumni